Pleospora alfalfae is a plant pathogen infecting alfalfa.

References

Fungal plant pathogens and diseases
Pleosporaceae
Fungi described in 1986